Salvia bowleyana (in Chinese: nan dan shen, nan-dan-shen) is a perennial plant native to China, south of the Yangtze River, growing on hillsides, beside streams, in forests, and in valleys between  elevation. It is used medicinally in China in the same way as Salvia miltiorrhiza and is often confused with it. Salvia miltiorrhiza's common name is "dan shen", while S. bowleyana's is "nan dan shen", which means "southern dan shen".

Notes

Plants described in 1908
bowleyana
Flora of China